Chen Yu (born 27 February 1981) is a Chinese synchronized swimmer who competed in the 2004 Summer Olympics.

References

1981 births
Living people
Chinese synchronized swimmers
Olympic synchronized swimmers of China
Synchronized swimmers at the 2004 Summer Olympics
Synchronized swimmers from Shanghai